Gledson da Silva Menezes (born 4 September 1979), known as Gledson, is a Brazilian former professional footballer who played as a defender.

Career 
Gledson was born in Felipe Guerra, Rio Grande do Norte.

He moved to reigning Bundesliga champions VfB Stuttgart from F.C. Hansa Rostock during the summer of 2007, having made 105 appearances in the 2. Bundesliga over the past three seasons.

On 3 January 2008, he returned to Hansa Rostock.

On 14 July 2009, he signed for FSV Frankfurt.

References

External links
 
 

Living people
1979 births
Sportspeople from Rio Grande do Norte
Association football defenders
Brazilian footballers
SC Fortuna Köln players
Rot Weiss Ahlen players
FC Hansa Rostock players
VfB Stuttgart players
FSV Frankfurt players
Bundesliga players
2. Bundesliga players
Brazilian expatriate footballers
Brazilian expatriate sportspeople in Germany
Expatriate footballers in Germany